Anbabu (also, Ambabu and Anbabo) is a village in the Astara Rayon of Azerbaijan.  The village forms part of the municipality of Motolayataq.

References 

Populated places in Astara District